The Brazilian Special Operations Command ( - C Op Esp) is a part of the Brazilian Army Commands, specifically the Land Army Command. Headquartered in Central Brazil, in Goiânia, C OP ESP is positioned under the larger Planalto Military Command. Specifically, it is linked to the Terrestrial Operations Command (COTER). Its motto; "any mission, in any place, at any time, by every way", perfectly sums up the capabilities of C Op Esp.

Creation of C Op Esp
C Op Esp traces its roots all the way back to 1957, when it was created as a parachute rescue group that conducted deep forest rescue operations. Special operations were then disbanded for much of the 20th century, but in 2003, the Presidential Decree No. 4.289 created the Special Operations Brigade that Brazil employs today. In 2013, the ordinance of Army Commander 142 changed the brigade's designation to Special Operations Command (C Op Esp).

Missions and Capabilities 

Today C Op Esp is a highly specialized and dynamic fighting force that operates all over Brazil. C Op Esp is trained in non conventional warfare, which means it is ready for any type of fight, against any fighting force. C Op Esp is trained to deal with much larger forces, they typically operate in small teams.

The C Op Esp uses a number of strategies to eliminate its enemies capabilities. Deploying its forces deep in enemy territory, including to the very rear of the enemy, is one of the many strategies C Op Esp employs. 

Some of C Op Esp's top level capabilities include; covert reconnaissance on the battlefield, the ability to perform search, destruction, neutralization and interdiction of targets of significant value, perform guided air strikes, rescue allies and high value targets, kidnap enemy personnel, and conduct operations classified as non conventional warfare.

One of C Op Esp's most valuable capabilities is the ability to deter and destroy guerilla groups. C Op Esp has dealt with guerilla groups before, and is specially trained to move the group into a larger fighting force such as the Brazilian Army. This strategy in turn leads to the destruction of the guerrilla group.

Another valuable capability that C Op Esp excels in is counterinsurgency and counterterrorism. Operations of this type include; rescuing hostages of any type, neutralization of explosives and other weapons used by terrorists, monitoring and spying on terrorist groups. 
 
The C Op Esp is the main arm of the Rapid Action Force which is supplemented by the following units: Brigade Parachute Infantry, 12th Light Infantry Brigade (Aeromovel) and the Army Aviation Squadron. The Rapid Action Force is a national force, capable of operating in the Amazon as well as the Pampas in the south. Equipped with the most technologically advanced equipment available to the Brazilian Military, the Rapid Action Force is proficient in land, water, and air operations.

Recently, Brazilian Special Forces have taken part in domestic and international operations. During the 2016 Rio Olympics, Brazilian Special forces provided security teams for events, and conducted covert operations in order to thwart any possible attacks on the games. These domestic operations were conducted by the special operations police force of the Brazilian Military.  Brazilian Special Forces also were integral in the defeat of para-military groups in Haiti. Since the hurricane that devastated Haiti, the country (Haiti) has been unable to deal with paramilitary groups that have plagued their cities. Brazilian Special Forces were an integral part of defeating these groups, while also providing peace keeping operations. Special forces played a key role in the 2018 federal intervention. Troops collected arrests and deaths of criminals.

Structure 

COpEsp is structured by the following subordinate units: 
 1st Special Forces Battalion (1º BFEsp) 
 1st Commando Actions Battalion (1º BAC)
 1st Battalion of Psychological Operations (1° BOpPsc)
 3rd Special Forces Company (3ª Cia FEsp)
 Special Operations Support Battalion (B Ap OpEsp)
 Administrative Base of the Special Operations Command (B Adm COpEsp)
 Chemical, Biological, Radiological and Nuclear Defense Company (Cia DQBRN)
 6th Army Police Platoon (6° Pel PE)

Equipment

Gallery

See also

 Brazilian Armed Forces
 Planalto Military Command

External links
 Brazilian Army
 Brazilian Ministry of Defense

References 

Special forces of Brazil
Military units and formations of Brazil